Petter Bruer Hanssen (born 8 January 1986) is a Norwegian footballer who plays as a midfielder. He joined IK Start in August 2008 for a reported fee of 2 million NOK. However, due to injuries, he was only able to amass 24 minutes of playing time in his first season with Start. He is known as a hard-working team player with good passing abilities.

Career statistics

References

1986 births
Living people
People from Stokke
Sportspeople from Tønsberg
Norwegian footballers
Norway youth international footballers
Norway under-21 international footballers
FK Tønsberg players
Odds BK players
IK Start players
Norwegian First Division players
Eliteserien players
Association football midfielders
Sportspeople from Vestfold og Telemark
21st-century Norwegian people